Beslan Vladimirovich Gubliya (born 29 November 1976) is a former Russian professional football player.

Club career
He made his Russian Football National League debut for FC Druzhba Maykop on 8 April 1998 in a game against FC CSK VVS-Kristall Smolensk.

On 12 August 2004, he appeared in the 2004–05 UEFA Cup first qualification round for FC Terek Grozny in a game against Lech Poznań.

Honours
 Russian Cup winner: 2004.

External links
 

1976 births
People from Cherkessk
Living people
Footballers from Abkhazia
Russian people of Abkhazian descent
Russian footballers
Association football midfielders
FC Dynamo Stavropol players
FC Akhmat Grozny players
FC Luch Vladivostok players
FC Novokuznetsk players
FC Spartak-UGP Anapa players
FC Mashuk-KMV Pyatigorsk players
Sportspeople from Karachay-Cherkessia